The First Battle of Solskjel  (Slaget ved Solskjel) was the first engagement in Harald Fairhair's attempt to subjugate western Norway to his rule.

The two kings of Nordmøre and Romsdal had joined forces to stop the fleet of king Harald, who was sailing south from Trøndelag. Harald was again victorious, and his two opponents Huntiof, King of Nordmøre and his father-in-law, King Nokkve of Romsdal, were both slain in battle. However Solve Klove, the son of King Huntiof escaped.

After the battle Harald laid both countries under his rule, and stayed there for the rest of the summer.

See also
Second battle of Solskjel
Glymdrápa

References

Primary source
 Sturluson, Snorri. Heimskringla: History of the Kings of Norway, translated Lee M. Hollander. Reprinted University of Texas Press, Austin, 1992.

Other sources
 Finlay, Alison (editor and translator) Fagrskinna, a Catalogue of the Kings of Norway (Brill Academic. 2004) 
 Hermannsson, Halldór  (2009) Bibliography of the sagas of the kings of Norway (BiblioBazaar) 
Jones, Gwyn (1984) A History of the Vikings (Oxford University Press. 2nd ed) .

Related reading
(In Norwegian)
 Krag, Claus (2000) Norges historie fram til 1319 (Universitetsforlaget) 

Solskjel
S
Solskjel
Solskjel
Harald Fairhair